Shipitsino is a rural locality (a village) in Kochyovskoye Rural Settlement, Kochyovsky District, Perm Krai, Russia. The population was 25 as of 2010. There are 2 streets.

Geography 
Shipitsino is located 16 km north of Kochyovo (the district's administrative centre) by road.

References 

Rural localities in Kochyovsky District